Lana Gorgadze (born 15 February 1997) is a Georgian footballer who plays as a midfielder and has appeared for the Georgia women's national team.

Career
Gorgadze has been capped for the Georgia national team, appearing for the team during the 2019 FIFA Women's World Cup qualifying cycle.

References

External links
 
 
 

1997 births
Living people
Women's footballers from Georgia (country)
Women's association football midfielders
Georgia (country) women's international footballers
FC Martve players